Annette Bjelkevik (born 12 May 1978) is a Norwegian speed skater. She was born in Arendal and is the sister of Hedvig Bjelkevik. She competed in the 1,500 m, 3,000 m and team pursuit at the 2006 Winter Olympics in Turin.

References

External links 
 

1978 births
Living people
People from Arendal
Norwegian female speed skaters
Olympic speed skaters of Norway
Speed skaters at the 2006 Winter Olympics
Twin sportspeople
Sportspeople from Agder